The Devon Energy Center (also known as the Devon Tower) is a 50-story corporate skyscraper in downtown Oklahoma City, Oklahoma. It is the tallest building in the city and state, though it has fewer floors than the 52-story BOK Tower in Tulsa. It is tied with Park Tower in Chicago as the 71st tallest building  in the United States. Construction began October 6, 2009, and was completed in October 2012. The tower is located next to the historic Colcord Hotel, which Devon currently owns, on Sheridan Avenue between Hudson and Robinson Avenues.

It serves as the northern anchor of Oklahoma City's aggressive Core to Shore downtown redevelopment project.

Background 
Devon World Headquarters LLC, a subsidiary of Oklahoma City-based Devon Energy Corporation, built the new skyscraper to replace their existing corporate office, which was located inside the Mid America Tower (now the Continental Resources Center), as well as other commercial space that the company had been leasing in a number of office buildings in the central business district.

Site preparation and demolition began October 6, 2009. The Holder Construction Company served as primary general contractor, and Flintco, Inc. the minority partner in the joint venture.

History

Construction 
Construction started on October 6, 2009. The first crane was installed on February 25, 2010, and the second crane was installed on June 25, 2010. In July 2010, construction had reached above street level. In September 2010, construction topped the 10th floor. In November, workers started installing glass on the bottom levels of the tower. In December 2010, the building reached the 22nd floor. 

Upon completion of the 34th floor, Devon Energy Center surpassed the  Chase Tower (since renamed BancFirst Tower) as the tallest building in Oklahoma City on March 10, 2011. On May 17 of that year, the Devon Energy Center became the tallest building in Oklahoma, rising above Tulsa's  BOK Tower. In June 2011, the building reached the 46th floor. On July 5, 2011, the building reached the 46th floor while the glass reached the 36th floor.

Completion and opening 
On October 23, 2012, the building marked its opening ceremony. It was confirmed by Devon Energy CEO, J. Larry Nichols that there would not be an observation deck; however, a restaurant named "Vast" on the 49th and 50th floors would be open to the general public. Oklahoma City Mayor Mick Cornett attended the opening ceremony and stated, "The visual impact it has on the city is so striking and so identifiable. It took just over three years to complete the building that has quickly become a staple in our city's skyline."

On June 14, 2022, conservative activist Maison Des Champs conducted a free solo climb along the tower as part of an anti-abortion protest. (Incidentally, weeks prior to his feat, the Oklahoma Legislature passed several laws severely restricting abortion access in the state, including one banning the practice from the moment of conception.) He had previously gained media attention for climbing The New York Times Building in Manhattan, the Aria Resort and Casino in Las Vegas and the Salesforce Tower in San Francisco to protest abortion or COVID-19 safety protocols. Des Champs—who only used chalk for gripping—was arrested after reaching the roof of the building, and was subsequently charged on two trespassing complaints.

Tenants
Devon Energy Corporation

Gallery

See also 

List of tallest buildings in Oklahoma City
List of tallest buildings in Oklahoma
List of tallest buildings in the United States

References

External links 

 
 Devon Tower Time Lapse Video
 Devon Tower layout
 Devon Tower Rendering

Oil company headquarters in the United States
Office buildings completed in 2012
Buildings and structures in Oklahoma City
Skyscraper office buildings in Oklahoma City
2012 establishments in Oklahoma